Ashley Fisher and Tripp Phillips were the defending champions, but Phillips chose not to participate, and only Fisher competed that year.
Fisher partnered with Jim Thomas, but lost in the semifinals to Jordan Kerr and Robert Lindstedt.

Jordan Kerr and Robert Lindstedt won in the final 6–4, 6–4, against Frank Dancevic and Stephen Huss.

Seeds

Draw

Draw

External links
Draw

Men's Doubles